Antonio Sambruno Aragón (born 15 July 1978) is a Spanish footballer who plays for San Fernando CD as a defender.

Club career
Born in Cádiz, Andalusia, Sambruno finished his graduation with hometown's Cádiz CF, making his senior debuts with the reserves in the 1995–96 season, only being promoted to first team three seasons later. In 2002–03, Sambruno appeared in 26 matches, scoring once, and achieved promotion to Segunda División. On 30 August 2003 he made his professional debut, starting in a 2–1 home win over Polideportivo Ejido.

In the following years Sambruno competed in Segunda División B but also in Tercera División, representing CD Castellón, CD Leganés, Cultural y Deportiva Leonesa, Racing Club Portuense, Villajoyosa CF and San Fernando CD.

References

External links
 
 Futbolme profile  

1978 births
Living people
Footballers from Cádiz
Spanish footballers
Association football defenders
Segunda División players
Segunda División B players
Tercera División players
Cádiz CF B players
Cádiz CF players
CD Castellón footballers
CD Leganés players
Cultural Leonesa footballers
Villajoyosa CF footballers